"Night Changes" is a song recorded by British-Irish boy band One Direction. It was written by the band alongside Jamie Scott, Julian Bunetta and John Ryan, while the production was handled by Bunetta and Ryan. The song was released on 14 November 2014 as the second and final single from their fourth studio album Four. It also marked the last single with member Zayn Malik. A moderate commercial success, the track is one of the band's most critically acclaimed, receiving praise for contemplating the fleeting nature of life with depth and maturity.

Background and release
"Night Changes" was revealed as the album's second single in an interview with radio host Scott Mills. The track was released on 14 November 2014, three days before the album's release.

Composition and lyrics
Developing on the themes of "Live While We're Young" and "Story of My Life", the song explores the rapid passage of time, seizing the moment in life, and gaining love along the way. The harmonies in the chorus, backed by rounds of "Oohs", give the song added depth and a "big contemplative feel." The song runs for 3 minutes and 47 seconds and begins in the key of A major. 2 minutes and 28 seconds into the song, the key changes to B major. The song samples the song, "Changes" by David Bowie.

Music video
The official music video was released on 21 November 2014 and directed by Ben Winston. This was One Direction's last video with Zayn Malik, as he departed from the band on 25 March 2015. Liam Payne's real-life girlfriend Sophia Smith was involved in the shoot, but did not appear on-screen.

The video is a point of view of going on a date with all 5 members of One Direction. The five dates take place in five different locations: a date with Zayn at an Italian restaurant (which he apparently owns as he greets some cooks and introduces his date to a waiter), a drive with Louis in his vintage car, a night in playing Monopoly and Jenga with Niall at his house next to a fireplace, ice skating with Harry and at a carnival with Liam.

As their dates progress, things end up going horribly wrong for all 5 members. Zayn's date's ex-boyfriend comes in, yells at her, then dumps water and spaghetti on Zayn, which prompts the date to leave Zayn as he looks on in disbelief. Harry spots another couple doing a very complicated trick on the ice rink and attempts to do it with his date, causing both of them to fall and get injured. Liam takes his date to one of the rides in the carnival, but he becomes nauseated while on the ride and throws up in his date's hat as they exit. Niall tends to his fireplace, but the sleeve of his shirt catches fire and he grabs a towel to put out the fire, which accidentally tips over a jug that spills juice on his date's dress. Louis gets pulled over by the police and tries to joke with the policeman, which results in him getting arrested, and the date watches as Louis is being driven away from her in the back of the police car.

Track listing
Digital EP
"Night Changes"  – 3:40
"Night Changes"  – 3:40
"Steal My Girl"  – 3:46
CD single
"Night Changes"  – 3:40
"Night Changes"  – 3:40

Charts and certifications

Weekly charts

Year-end charts

Certifications

References

2014 songs
2014 singles
One Direction songs
Syco Music singles
Columbia Records singles
Pop ballads
Songs about nights
Songs written by Julian Bunetta
Songs written by Jamie Scott
Songs written by John Ryan (musician)
Songs written by Louis Tomlinson
Songs written by Niall Horan
Songs written by Zayn Malik
Songs written by Harry Styles
Songs written by Liam Payne
2010s ballads